The A77 motorway is a short motorway in the Netherlands. It is located in the Dutch provinces of North Brabant and Limburg.

Overview
The road is 10 kilometer in length. The A77 motorway connects the A73 motorway at the interchange Rijkevoort with Boxmeer, Gennep and the German Bundesautobahn 57.

The European route E31 follows the entire length of the A77 motorway.

Exit list

References

External links

Motorways in the Netherlands
Motorways in Limburg (Netherlands)
Motorways in North Brabant
Transport in Land van Cuijk
Gennep